Thung Yang Daeng is a district (amphoe) of Pattani province, southern Thailand.

History
The minor district (king amphoe) Thung Yang Daeng was created on 16 May 1977, when four tambons were split off from Mayo district. On 4 July 1994 it was upgraded to a full district.

Geography
Neighboring districts are (from the south clockwise): Raman of Yala province; Yarang, Mayo, Sai Buri, and Kapho of Pattani Province.

Administration
The district is divided into four sub-districts (tambons), which are further subdivided into 22 villages (mubans). There are no municipal (thesabans). There are four tambon administrative organizations (TAO).

References

External links
amphoe.com

Districts of Pattani province